Det här är platsen is the fifth studio album by Swedish singer Peter Jöback. It was released in 2004.

Track listing
Är det här platsen
Du har förlorat mer än jag
Sommarens sista sång
Ingen skyldighet
Mellan en far och en son
Bland nattens skuggor
Jag bär dig
Du behöver ingen hjälp
Glömskans tåg
Gör det nu
I allt jag ser

Contributors
Peter Jöback - vocals
Lars Halapi – guitar, pedal steel, vibraphone, producer
Peter Korhonen  - drums
Thomas Axelsson  - bass
Robert Qwarforth  - piano, organ, synth

Charts

Weekly charts

Year-end charts

References

2004 albums
Peter Jöback albums
Swedish-language albums